The 1955–56 Honduran Amateur League was the ninth edition of the Honduran Amateur League.  C.D. Hibueras obtained its 2nd national title.  The season ran from 16 October 1955 to 12 December 1956.

Regional champions
For the first time the departments of Colón and Comayagua included a team to participate in the national championship.

Known results

National championship round
Played in a double round-robin format between the regional champions.  Also known as the Hexagonal.

Known results

Hibuera's lineup

References

Liga Amateur de Honduras seasons
Honduras
1955 in Honduras
1956 in Honduras